Sozzani is a surname. Notable people with the surname include:

Carla Sozzani (born 1947), Italian book and magazine editor, gallerist, and businesswoman
Franca Sozzani (1950–2016), Italian journalist and magazine editor
Meli Valdés Sozzani (born 1977), Argentine artist

See also
Sozzini family